Andreatta is an Italian surname. Notable people with the surname include:

 Beniamino Andreatta (1928–2007), Italian economist and politician
 Margarida Davina Andreatta (1922–2015), Brazilian archaeologist
 Melissa Andreatta, Australian football coach

Italian-language surnames
Patronymic surnames